Events from the year 1826 in France.

Incumbents
 Monarch – Charles X
 Prime Minister – Joseph de Villèle

Events

15 January - The newspaper Le Figaro begins publication in Paris, initially as a weekly.
June - Photography: Nicéphore Niépce makes a true photograph, View from the Window at Le Gras.
19 August - Louis Christophe François Hachette purchases the Brédif bookshop on rue Pierre-Sarrazin, Paris, origin of the Hachette publishing business.
Unknown date - Société alsacienne de constructions mécaniques founded; becomes part of Alstom, global railway rolling stock manufacturer.

Arts and literature
The second novel by Victor Hugo, Bug-Jargal, is published.

Births
6 April - Gustave Moreau, painter (died 1898)
5 May - Eugénie de Montijo, wife of Napoléon III (died 1920)
18 May - Emile-Justin Menier, pharmaceutical manufacturer, chocolatier and politician (died 1881)
29 June - Charles Ernest Beulé, archaeologist and politician (died 1874)
24 October - Léopold Victor Delisle, bibliophile and historian (died 1910)

Full date unknown
Alphonse de Polignac, mathematician (died 1863)
Louis-Arsène Delaunay, actor (died 1903)

Deaths
3 January
 Marie Le Masson Le Golft, naturalist (born 1750)
Louis Gabriel Suchet, Marshal of France (born 1770)
22 January - Henri-Cardin-Jean-Baptiste d'Aguesseau, politician (born 1746)
2 February - Jean Anthelme Brillat-Savarin, lawyer, politician, epicure and gastronome (born 1755)
8 October - Marie-Guillemine Benoist, painter (born 1768)
5 November - Élie Halévy (Chalfan), Hebrew poet and author (born 1760)

Full date unknown
Jean-Baptiste Stouf, sculptor (born 1742)

See also

References

1820s in France